Stefan Wittwer (born March 26, 1971) is a Swiss nordic combined skier who competed in 1995 and 1996. He won a bronze medal in the 4 x 5 km team event at the 1995 FIS Nordic World Ski Championships in Thunder Bay, Ontario.

Wittwer's best individual finish was 2nd in the 15 km individual in Oberhof, Germany in 1996.

External links 

1971 births
Swiss male Nordic combined skiers
Living people
FIS Nordic World Ski Championships medalists in Nordic combined